Philip Smith is a New Zealand film and television writer and producer. He is the founder and owner of Australasian media company, Great Southern Television, with offices in Sydney, Auckland and Queenstown.

Smith was awarded the Independent Producer of the Year Award by the Screen Production and Development Association. In 2018 he was named New Zealand Drama Writer of the Year, for the telemovie Why Does Love at the NZTV Awards. In 2020, he co-created the NZ drama, One Lane Bridge, which screens in 28 countries, including AMC in the USA and Arte in France. It won Best Drama in NZ in 2021.

According to IMDB Smith has created or co-created 70 television series in New Zealand and Australia, making him Australasia's leading television creative.  He was previously a journalist at the New Zealand Herald. He left to join the Financial Times where he worked as a foreign correspondent from war-plagued nations including Burundi and Rwanda
. He was the Financial Times correspondent based in Tanzania, East Africa.

Smith was later a journalist at TVNZ and broke the "Bad Blood Scandal" - an award-winning news investigation.  He was the presenter of the Wednesday Wire at Auckland's student radio station BFM for three years. He worked for TVNZ in London and covered the Romanian revolution and also reported from Hungary. He won a New York Film and Television Award for his reporting on the Vulcan volcano eruption in Papua New Guinea.

He was the bass player in alternative band This Nations Dreaming which won single of the year in 1990.

Smith formed his first television company Uplink Sport with sports presenter Phillip Leishman. He sold the company to UK based sports marketing company Sportsworld Media. He started up a second television production company, Great Southern Television in 2002 with retailer Sir David Levene. The company produces drama, factual and entertainment shows globally.

Personal life

As of 2006, Smith lived in Queenstown with his wife, Leanne Malcolm, a radio and television broadcaster, and their son.

References

New Zealand businesspeople
New Zealand reporters and correspondents
Year of birth missing (living people)
Living people